This is a list of people whose ideas became part of Nazi ideology. The ideas, writings, and speeches of these thinkers were incorporated into what became Nazism, including  antisemitism, eugenics, racial hygiene, the concept of the master race, and Lebensraum. The list includes people whose ideas were incorporated, even if they did not live in the Nazi era.

Philosophers and sociologists
 Alfred Baeumler (1887–1968), German philosopher in Nazi Germany. He was a leading interpreter of Friedrich Nietzsche's philosophy as legitimizing Nazism. Thomas Mann read Baeumler's work on Nietzsche in the early 1930s, and characterized passages of it as "Hitler prophecy."
 Houston Stewart Chamberlain (1855–1927) was a British-born author of books on political philosophy, and natural science. His two-volume book Die Grundlagen des Neunzehnten Jahrhunderts (Foundations of the 19th. Century) (1899) became a manual for Nazi racial philosophy including the concept of the master race.  Considered to be one of Hitler's intellectual mentors.
Karl Haushofer (1869–1946) was a German general, professor, geographer, and politician. Through his student Rudolf Hess, Haushofer's ideas known as Geopolitiks influenced the development of Adolf Hitler's expansionist strategies.
Rudolf Jung (1882–1945), the author of Der Nationale Sozialismus, a theoretical work on national socialism which, the author believed, played the same role for national socialism that Das Kapital played for Marxism.
 Ernst Krieck (1882–1947), German pedagogue. 

 Alfred Rosenberg (1893–1946), considered one of the main authors of key Nazi ideological creeds, including the racial policy of Nazi Germany, antisemitism, Lebensraum, abrogation of the Treaty of Versailles, and opposition to degenerate art. He is also known for his rejection of Christianity, while playing a role in the development of Positive Christianity. At Nuremberg he was tried, sentenced to death, and executed by hanging as a war criminal.
 Herman Schmalenbach (1885–1950), who refined the concepts of Gemeinschaft and Bund.
Carl Schmitt (11 July 1888 – 7 April 1985) was a jurist, philosopher, political theorist, and professor of law. Schmitt joined the Nazi Party on 1 May 1933. He presented his theories as an ideological foundation of the Nazi dictatorship, and a justification of the "Führer" state with regard to legal philosophy, in particular through the concept of auctoritas. Nevertheless, in December 1936, the SS publication Das schwarze Korps accused Schmitt of being an opportunist, a Hegelian state thinker and basically a Catholic, and called his anti-semitism a mere pretense, citing earlier statements in which he criticized the Nazis' racial theories. After this, Schmitt resigned from his position as "Reichsfachgruppenleiter" (Reich Professional Group Leader), although he retained his post as a professor in Berlin, and his post as "Preußischer Staatsrat". Although Schmitt continued to be investigated into 1937, further reprisals were stopped by Göring. In 1945, Schmitt was captured by the American forces and released in 1946. Schmitt refused every attempt at de-nazification, which effectively barred him from positions in academia.

Scientists and physicians
 Karl Brandt (1904–1948), SS officer and physician, Hitler's personal doctor for a period, was the administrator of the Aktion T4 euthanasia program.
 Eugen Fischer, German biologist, member of the Nazi Party, prominent in genetics and "racial hygiene".
 Hans F. K. Günther (1891–1968), German race researcher and eugenicist in the Weimar Republic and Nazi Germany, also known as "Rassengünther" (Race Günther) or "Rassenpapst" (Race Pope). He is considered to be a major influence on National Socialist racialist thought, and was a member of the Nazi Party.
 Philipp Lenard (1862–1947), Nobel laureate and ideologue of the Deutsche Physik movement.
 Fritz Lenz, German geneticist, member of the Nazi Party, and influential specialist in "racial hygiene".
 Josef Mengele (1911-1979), Nazi SS officer and physician at the Auschwitz death camp who performed inhumane experiments on the inmates there.  Known as the "Angel of Death".
 Alfred Ploetz (1860–1940), German physician, biologist, and eugenicist who introduced the concept of racial hygiene in Germany. He was a member of the Nazi party. His brother Ernst Rüdin, also a committed National Socialist, praised him in 1938 as a man who "by his meritorious services has helped to set up our Nazi ideology."
 Johannes Stark (1874–1957), Nobel laureate and ideologue of the Deutsche Physik movement.
 Otmar Freiherr von Verschuer (1896–1969), German human biologist and eugenicist primarily concerned with racial hygiene and twin research.

Theologians and spiritual leaders
 Ernst Bergmann (1881–1945), German philosopher who in his work, Die 25 Thesen der Deutschreligion (Twenty-five Points of the German Religion), held that the Old Testament and portions of the New Testament of the Bible were inaccurate. He claimed that Jesus was not a Jew and of Aryan origin, and that Adolf Hitler was the new messiah.
 Savitri Devi, pseudonym of the Greek-French writer Maximiani Portas. A prominent proponent of animal rights, deep ecology and Neo-nazism, who served the Axis cause during World War II by spying in India.
 Jakob Wilhelm Hauer (1881–1962), German Indologist and religious studies writer. He was the founder of the German Faith Movement.
 Ludwig Müller (1883–1945), was a theologian and church leader who played a major role in the Nazi party's attempt to misdirect the Protestant, mainly Lutheran churches of Germany toward a basis in Aryan ideology and away from its Jewish origins.  He had a leading part in the Nazi, Gleichschaltung, the plan to unite the previously independent Protestant churches into a single Church of the New Order, which is part of longer history of an attempt to unify the churches under the German Evangelical Church, see Reichskirche.  Withholding baptism from non-Aryans was enforced in most churches during the Nazi period, though not without some protest.

Others
Richard Walther Darré (1895–1953), one of the leading Nazi blood and soil ideologists. He served as Reich Minister of Food and Agriculture from 1933 to 1942.
Anton Drexler (1884–1942), German Nazi political leader of the 1920s. He joined the Fatherland Party during World War I. He was a poet and a member of the völkisch agitators who, together with journalist Karl Harrer, founded the German Workers' Party (DAP) in Munich with Gottfried Feder and Dietrich Eckart in 1919.
 Dietrich Eckart (1868–1923), who developed the ideology of a "genius higher human", based on writings by Lanz von Liebenfels. He was a member of the Nazi party.
Gottfried Feder (1883–1941), economist and one of the early key members of the Nazi Party. He was their economic theoretician. It was his lecture in 1919 that drew Hitler into the party.
 Joseph Goebbels (1887–1945) Goebbels, the Nazi propaganda minister, was perhaps the most intellectual of the major figures in Nazi Germany.  Originally part of the "left-wing" of Nazism under Gregor and Otto Strasser, Goebbels broke with them after Hitler took pains to personally indoctrinate Goebbels and convert him to support the mainstream of the party, which Hitler controlled.
 Erik Jan Hanussen The documentary Hitler and the Occult describes how Hitler “seemed endowed with even greater authority and charisma” after he had resumed public speaking in March 1927. The narrator states that “this may have been due to the influence” of the clairvoyant performer and publicist Erik Jan Hanussen. "Hanussen helped Hitler perfect a series of exaggerated poses,” useful for speaking before a huge audience. The documentary then interviews Dusty Sklar about the contact between Hitler and Hanussen, and the narrator makes the statement about “occult techniques of mind control and crowd domination." In 1929, Hanussen predicted, for example, that Wilhelm II would return to Germany in 1930 and that the problem of unemployment would be solved in 1931.
 Heinrich Himmler Himmler was interested in mysticism and the occult from an early age. He tied this interest into his racist philosophy, looking for proof of Aryan and Nordic racial superiority from ancient times. He promoted a cult of ancestor worship, particularly among members of the SS, as a way to keep the race pure and provide immortality to the nation. Viewing the SS as an "order" along the lines of the Teutonic Knights, he had them take over the Church of the Teutonic Order in Vienna in 1939. He began the process of replacing Christianity with a new moral code that rejected humanitarianism and challenged the Christian concept of marriage. The Ahnenerbe, a research society founded by Himmler in 1935, searched the globe for proof of the superiority and ancient origins of the Germanic race. 
 Ernst Rudolf Huber (1903–1990) was a German lawyer who provided legal rationalizations for the Nazi regime. 
Lanz von Liebenfels (1874–1954), monk and theologian who influenced Nazi ideology by inventing a blend of theology and biology called theozoology.
Ernst Schertel An article "Hitler's Forgotten Library" by Timothy Ryback, published in The Atlantic (May 2003), mentions a book from Hitler's private library authored by Ernst Schertel. Schertel, whose interests were flagellation, dance, occultism, nudism and BDSM, had also been active as an activist for sexual liberation before 1933. He had been imprisoned in Nazi Germany for seven months and his doctoral degree was revoked. He is supposed to have sent a dedicated copy of his 1923 book Magic: History, Theory and Practice to Hitler some time in the mid-1920s. Hitler is said to have marked extensive passages, including one which reads "He who does not have the demonic seed within himself will never give birth to a magical world".
 Gregor Strasser (1892–1934) Involved in the Kapp Putsch he formed his own völkischer Wehrverband ("popular defense union") which he merged into the NSDAP in 1921. Initially a loyal supporter of Adolf Hitler, he took part in the Beer Hall Putsch and held a number of high positions in the Nazi Party. Soon however, Strasser became a strong advocate of the socialist wing of the party, arguing that the national revolution should also include strong action to tackle poverty and should seek to build working class support.
 Julius Streicher (1885–1946), the founder and publisher of Der Stürmer newspaper, which became a central element of the Nazi propaganda machine. His portrayal of Jews as subhuman and evil played a critical role in the dehumanization and marginalization of the Jewish minority in the eyes of common Germans – creating the necessary conditions for the later perpetration of the Holocaust. He was a member of the Nazi party.

Intellectuals indirectly associated with Nazism
Some writers came before the Nazi era and their writings were incorporated into Nazi ideology:

Madame Blavatsky (1831–1891), founder of Theosophy and the Theosophical Society. Guido von List took up some of Blavatsky's racial theories, and mixed them with nationalism to create occultic Ariosophy, a precursor of Nazi ideology.  Ariosophy  emphasized intellectual expositions of racial evolution. The Thule Society was one of several German occult groups drawing on Ariosophy to preach Aryan supremacy. It provides a direct link between occult racial theories and the racial ideology of Hitler and the emerging Nazi party.
 Emile Burnouf (1821–1907) was a racialist whose ideas influenced the development of theosophy and Aryanism.
 Julius Evola (1898–1974), a philosopher described as an "ultra-fascist" with an interest in the occult and Eastern religions
 Henry Ford (1863–1947) American industrialist, the founder of the Ford Motor Company, and sponsor of the development of the assembly line technique of mass production.   His book "The International Jew" was praised by Hitler for its antisemitic rhetoric.
 Bernhard Förster (1843–1889), German antisemite teacher who wrote on the Jewish question, where he characterizes Jews as constituting a "parasite on the German body".
 Hans Freyer (1887–1969), German sociologist who called for an anti-liberal, anti-materialist, anti-Marxist Revolution von rechts (Revolution from the Right) that would emphasize organic bonds and community (Gemeinschaft) over the atomization of industrialized society (Gesellschaft).
 Arthur de Gobineau (1816–1882) was a French aristocrat, novelist and man of letters who developed the racialist theory of the Aryan master race in his book An Essay on the Inequality of the Human Races (1853–1855). Although the book condemns antisemitism and describes Jews in positive terms, the Nazis still referenced the work since it condemns race mixing and describes the Jews as "alien". De Gobineau is credited as being the father of modern racial demography.
 Madison Grant (1865–1937), American lawyer, known primarily for his work as a eugenicist and conservationist. As a eugenicist, Grant was responsible for one of the most widely read works of scientific racism, and played an active role in crafting strong immigration restriction and anti-miscegenation laws in the United States.
 Paul de Lagarde (1827–1891) was a German biblical scholar and orientalist. His Deutsche Schriften (1878–1881) became a nationalist text.
 Guido Karl Anton List (1848–1919), his concept of renouncing Christianity and returning to the paganism of the ancient Europeans found supporters within the Nazi party. He developed Ariosophy, a precursor of Nazi ideology.
Oswald Spengler (1880–1936), German historian and philosopher. He is best known for his book The Decline of the West and the cyclical theory of the rise and decline of civilizations. He wrote extensively throughout World War I and the interwar period, and supported German hegemony in Europe. The National Socialists held Spengler as an intellectual precursor but he was ostracized after 1933 for his pessimism about Germany and Europe's future, and his refusal to support Nazi ideas of racial superiority.
 Lothrop Stoddard (1883–1950), American political theorist, historian, eugenicist, and anti-immigration advocate who wrote a number of prominent books on scientific racism. He developed the concept of the untermensch.
 Adolf Stoecker (1835–1909), court chaplain to Kaiser Wilhelm and an antisemitic German theologian who founded one of the first antisemitic political parties in Germany, the Christian Social Party. He proposed severely limiting the civil rights of Jews in Germany. In September 1879 he delivered a speech entitled "What we demand of modern Jewry", in which he spelled out several demands of German Jews.
 Georges Vacher de Lapouge (1854–1936), French anthropologist, eugenicist, and anti-semite who developed the idea of a "Selectionist State" that would implement coercive measures to maintain the dominance and purity of dolichocephalic Aryans. His work strongly influenced Nazi eugenicists such as Hans F. K. Günther.

References

Lists of people by ideology